Tseng Yu-ho (曾佑和; 1924-2017), who is also known as Betty Ecke, was an artist, art historian and educator.

Biography 
She was born in Peking, China. As the daughter of an admiral, she had a privileged upbringing. Tseng started painting when she was 11, when she was bedridden for 3 months with pleurisy. When she recovered, she began studying paintingwith the chief Manchu House representative Prince Pu Jin. She graduated from Fu-jen University in 1942, and then pursued graduate studies in Chinese art history and Chinese literature at Fu-jen University and Peking University. She married art historian Gustav Ecke in 1945. Tseng started receiving international recognition in 1946, when Michael Sullivan began praising and writing about her work.

The Eckes moved to Honolulu in 1949, where Tseng earned a master's degree from the University of Hawaii at Manoa and was the curator of Asian Art at the Honolulu Academy of Arts from 1950 to 1963.

In 1953, she received a Rockefeller Foundation scholarship to study art collections in the United States. In 1954 the Smithsonian Institution toured her solo exhibition to ten museums. Tseng had a solo exhibition at the Walker Art Center in 1959. In 1972, she received a PhD in Asian art history from New York University Institute of Fine Arts. She taught Chinese Art History at the University of Hawaii at Manoa from the 1970s to 1986. Yu-ho was one of the founding members of the Society of Asian Art of Hawaii.

She died in China on Sept. 16, 2017.

As an artist, Tseng Yu-ho is best known for her collages created by tearing and layering colored handmade papers. She called these artworks "Dsui Hua" paintings. Seagulls from 1965, in the collection of the Honolulu Museum of Art, is an example of this collage technique.

Style and works 
Tseng Yu-ho works vary across different mediums including traditional Chinese mount-making, calligraphy, and paintings. She started developing her "Dsui Hua" paintings in the early 1950s which would later become her signature style. Her work would later become more abstract but would still keep a connection to the classical Chinese canon.

Selected publications 

 Arnason, H. H. and Tseng Yu-Ho, Tseng Yu-Ho: Exhibition of Paintings in Watercolor-Collage, The Downtown Gallery, New York, 1960
 Ecke, Tseng Yu-Ho, Chinese Folk Art in American Collections Early 15th Through 20th Centuries, China Institute in America, New York, 1976
 Ecke, Tseng Yu-Ho Chinese Folk Art II: in American Collections, From Early 15th Century to Early 20th Century, University of Hawaii Press, 1977 ASIN: B00070SJ92
 Nakano, Toru; Ecke, Tseng Yuho; Cahill, Suzanne, Bronze Mirrors from Ancient China: Donald H. Graham Jr. Collection, Orientations, Hong Kong, 1994 
 Yuho, Tseng; Link, Howard A., The Art of Tseng Yuho, Honolulu Academy of the Arts, 1989 
 Yuho, Tseng, A History of Chinese Calligraphy, The Chinese University Press, Hong Kong, 1993, 
 Yuho, Tseng, Dsui Hua: Dsui Paintings, a Retrospective Exhibition, Hanart T Z Gallery, Hong Kong/Taipei, 1992 ASIN: B0023X7EWY
 Yu-Ho, Tseng, Some Contemporary Elements in Classical Chinese Art, University of Hawaii Press, 1963

Footnotes

1924 births
2017 deaths
Artists from Hawaii
20th-century Chinese women artists
20th-century Chinese artists
21st-century Chinese women artists
21st-century Chinese artists
Collage artists
Women collage artists
American art historians
Women art historians
American orientalists
New York University Institute of Fine Arts alumni
Women orientalists
Chinese emigrants to the United States
Chinese women curators
American women curators
American curators